Larry Ali Donald (born January 6, 1967) is an American former professional boxer. As an amateur he won a bronze medal in the super heavyweight division at the 1991 World Championships and won a gold medal at the 1992 World Championship Challenge and becoming amateur world Super heavyweight champion going into the 1992 Olympic Games represented the United States at the 1992 Olympics. During his professional career, he defeated the likes of Evander Holyfield, Jeremy Williams, Bert Cooper, Tim Witherspoon, and Ross Puritty.

Amateur career
Donald was the American representative at Super Heavyweight at the 1992 Barcelona Olympic Games. His results were:
1st round bye
Defeated Nikolay Kulpin (Unified Team/Former Soviet Union) RSC 3 
Lost to Roberto Balado (Cuba) 4–10

In addition to his Olympic run, Donald had a successful amateur career, including:
National Golden Gloves Super Heavyweight Champion (1989, 1990)
United States National Amateur Champion at Super Heavyweight (1991)

He also won the World Championship Challenge in Tampa, Florida, March 13–14, 1992, right before going into the 1992 Summer Olympics.

Donald finished his with 72 fights, completing a record of 67 wins, 5 losses.

Professional career

Larry "The Legend" Donald turned pro on January 3, 1993, earning a technical knockout against Craig Brinson. In 1994 he beat fellow undefeated prospect Jeremy Williams, and Bert Cooper, but suffered his first defeat when losing widely to ex-champ Riddick Bowe, who had infamously sucker punched Donald twice at the pre-fight press conference.

He resurfaced in late 1997 outpointing ex-champ Tim Witherspoon, but spent many years fighting low profile on Don King under cards, unpopular with fans and the press for his negative, ultra-defensive and extremely unentertaining style.

In July 2001 he had a high-profile world title eliminator with Kirk Johnson, 31–0–1, but lost a close decision.

In 2002 he traveled to Germany to face Vitali Klitschko. Even at the age of 35, Donald was considered one of the most durable fighters in the world, but the heavy hitting Klitschko surprisingly stopped the veteran, decking him three times in the 10th round.

Although things looked over, Donald seemingly reinvented himself in November 2004 with an upset win over the legendary Evander Holyfield, winning nearly every round against the Hall of Famer ex-champ for the NABC World Champion Title.

In 2005, Donald controversially lost a title eliminator bout to giant-sized Russian Nicolay Valuev which would have earned him the right to fight John Ruiz for the WBA belt.

On July 30, 2007, Donald returned to ring to face Alexander Povetkin, and lost a lopsided decision.

Professional boxing record

{|class="wikitable" style="text-align:center"
|-
!
!Result
!Record
!Opponent
!Type
!Round, time
!Date
!Location
!Notes
|-
|50
|Loss
|42–5–3
|align=left|Alexander Povetkin
|UD
|10
|30 Jun 2007
|align=left|
|align=left|
|-
|49
|Loss
|42–4–3
|align=left|Nikolay Valuev
|MD
|12
|1 Oct 2005
|align=left|
|align=left|
|-
|48
|Draw
|42–3–3
|align=left|Ray Austin
|MD
|12
|30 Apr 2005
|align=left|
|align=left|
|-
|47
|Win
|42–3–2
|align=left|Evander Holyfield
|UD
|12
|13 Nov 2004
|align=left|
|align=left|
|-
|46
|Win
|41–3–2
|align=left|Mario Cawley
|TKO
|3 (10), 
|7 Aug 2004
|align=left|
|align=left|
|-
|45
|Win
|40–3–2
|align=left|Sedreck Fields
|UD
|10
|15 May 2004
|align=left|
|align=left|
|-
|44
|Loss
|39–3–2
|align=left|Vitali Klitschko
|TKO
|10 (12), 
|23 Nov 2002
|align=left|
|align=left|
|-
|43
|Win
|39–2–2
|align=left|James Stanton
|UD
|10
|1 Jun 2002
|align=left|
|align=left|
|-
|42
|Loss
|38–2–2
|align=left|Kirk Johnson
|UD
|10
|7 Jul 2001
|align=left|
|align=left|
|-
|41
|Draw
|38–1–2
|align=left|Obed Sullivan
|MD
|12
|28 Nov 2000
|align=left|
|align=left|
|-
|40
|Win
|38–1–1
|align=left|Phil Jackson
|KO
|5 (10), 
|25 May 2000
|align=left|
|align=left|
|-
|39
|Win
|37–1–1
|align=left|Mark Bradley
|TKO
|2 (12), 
|29 Feb 2000
|align=left|
|align=left|
|-
|38
|Win
|36–1–1
|align=left|Jeff Lally
|TKO
|2 (10), 
|11 Dec 1999
|align=left|
|align=left|
|-
|37
|Win
|35–1–1
|align=left|Marion Wilson
|TD
|5 (10)
|12 Jun 1999
|align=left|
|align=left|
|-
|36
|Win
|34–1–1
|align=left|Artis Pendergrass
|UD
|10
|6 Mar 1999
|align=left|
|align=left|
|-
|35
|Win
|33–1–1
|align=left|Mike Sedillo
|UD
|10
|18 Dec 1998
|align=left|
|align=left|
|-
|34
|Win
|32–1–1
|align=left|Ross Puritty
|UD
|10
|21 Apr 1998
|align=left|
|align=left|
|-
|33
|Win
|31–1–1
|align=left|Levi Billups
|UD
|10
|5 Feb 1998
|align=left|
|align=left|
|-
|32
|Win
|30–1–1
|align=left|Tim Witherspoon
|UD
|10
|13 Dec 1997
|align=left|
|align=left|
|-
|31
|Win
|29–1–1
|align=left| Ricardo Kennedy
|TKO
|5 (10), 
|6 Nov 1997
|align=left|
|align=left|
|-
|30
|Win
|28–1–1
|align=left|Tyrell Biggs
|KO
|2 (10), 
|11 Sep 1997
|align=left|
|align=left|
|-
|29
|Win
|27–1–1
|align=left|Jeff Lally
|KO
|3 (10)
|30 Aug 1997
|align=left|
|align=left|
|-
|28
|Win
|26–1–1
|align=left| Jose Ribalta
|TKO
|6 (10)
|15 Jul 1997
|align=left|
|align=left|
|-
|27
|Win
|25–1–1
|align=left|Anthony Willis
|TKO
|9 (10)
|5 Jun 1997
|align=left|
|align=left|
|-
|26
|Win
|24–1–1
|align=left| Ahmed Abdin
|UD
|12
|8 Apr 1997
|align=left|
|align=left|
|-
|25
|Win
|23–1–1
|align=left|Cleveland Woods
|PTS
|8
|24 Jan 1997
|align=left|
|align=left|
|-
|24
|Win
|22–1–1
|align=left|James Gaines
|UD
|10
|17 Dec 1996
|align=left|
|align=left|
|-
|23
|Win
|21–1–1
|align=left|Richard Mason
|UD
|10
|8 Nov 1996
|align=left|
|-
|22
|Win
|20–1–1
|align=left|Derrick Roddy
|TKO
|2 (10), 
|8 Aug 1996
|align=left|
|align=left|
|-
|21
|Win
|19–1–1
|align=left| Jorge Valdes
|TKO
|6 (12), 
|2 Jun 1996
|align=left|
|align=left|
|-
|20
|Win
|18–1–1
|align=left|Will Hinton
|SD
|10
|3 May 1996
|align=left|
|align=left|
|-
|19
|Win
|17–1–1
|align=left|Brian Sargent
|TKO
|2 (10), 
|16 Sep 1995
|align=left|
|align=left|
|-
|18
|Draw
|16–1–1
|align=left|David Dixon
|TD
|4 (10), 
|28 Mar 1995
|align=left|
|align=left|
|-
|17
|Loss
|16–1
|align=left|Riddick Bowe
|UD
|12
|3 Dec 1994
|align=left|
|align=left|
|-
|16
|Win
|16–0
|align=left|Dan Murphy
|UD
|10
|5 Jul 1994
|align=left|
|align=left|
|-
|15
|Win
|15–0
|align=left|Juan Antonio Diaz
|KO
|6 (12), 
|4 Jun 1994
|align=left|
|align=left|
|-
|14
|Win
|14–0
|align=left|Bert Cooper
|TKO
|7 (12), 
|14 Apr 1994
|align=left|
|align=left|
|-
|13
|Win
|13–0
|align=left|Jeremy Williams
|MD
|12
|12 Mar 1994
|align=left|
|align=left|
|-
|12
|Win
|12–0
|align=left|Michael Dixon
|TKO
|6 (10), 
|13 Feb 1994
|align=left|
|align=left|
|-
|11
|Win
|11–0
|align=left|Dwayne Hall
|TKO
|3 (6)
|16 Dec 1993
|align=left|
|align=left|
|-
|10
|Win
|10–0
|align=left|Eugene Adams
|TKO
|2 (6)
|19 Nov 1993
|align=left|
|align=left|
|-
|9
|Win
|9–0
|align=left|Kimmuel Odum
|TKO
|1 (?)
|30 Oct 1993
|align=left|
|align=left|
|-
|8
|Win
|8–0
|align=left|Mike Gans
|KO
|3 (8)
|27 Aug 1993
|align=left|
|align=left|
|-
|7
|Win
|7–0
|align=left|Al Shoffner
|KO
|5 (6), 
|17 Jul 1993
|align=left|
|align=left|
|-
|6
|Win
|6–0
|align=left| Daniel Dăncuță
|MD
|6
|6 Jun 1993
|align=left|
|align=left|
|-
|5
|Win
|5–0
|align=left|Will Hinton
|TKO
|4 (6), 
|8 May 1993
|align=left|
|align=left|
|-
|4
|Win
|4–0
|align=left|Matthew Brooks
|UD
|6
|14 Mar 1993
|align=left|
|align=left|
|-
|3
|Win
|3–0
|align=left|Louis Edward Jackson
|KO
|4 (6), 
|6 Feb 1993
|align=left|
|align=left|
|-
|2
|Win
|2–0
|align=left|Bruce Johnson
|TKO
|2 (6), 
|17 Jan 1993
|align=left|
|align=left|
|-
|1
|Win
|1–0
|align=left|Craig Brinson
|TKO
|2 (6), 
|3 Jan 1993
|align=left|
|align=left|
|-

References

External links
 

Heavyweight boxers
African-American boxers
1967 births
Living people
Boxers from Cincinnati
Olympic boxers of the United States
Boxers at the 1992 Summer Olympics
National Golden Gloves champions
Winners of the United States Championship for amateur boxers
American male boxers
AIBA World Boxing Championships medalists
21st-century African-American people
20th-century African-American sportspeople